Assad Vala (born 5 August 1987) is a Papua New Guinean cricketer and the captain of the national side. A left-handed batsman and off spin bowler, he has played for the Papua New Guinea national cricket team since 2005.

Early career
Born in Papua New Guinea in 1987, Assad Vala first represented Papua New Guinea at Under-19 level, playing in the 2004 Under-19 World Cup in Bangladesh. He made his debut for the senior side at the 2005 ICC Trophy in Ireland, where he played his seven List A matches.

He returned to Under-19 level later in the year, playing in the Africa/East Asia-Pacific Under-19 Championship at Willowmoore Park in Benoni, South Africa. In 2006, he played for a combined East Asia Pacific team in the Australian National Country Cricket Championship, an event he has repeated in 2007 and 2008.

In 2007, he played in Division Three of the World Cricket League in Darwin and he represented his country at the 2007 South Pacific Games, where he won a gold medal in the cricket tournament.

International career
He made his One Day International (ODI) debut for Papua New Guinea on 8 November 2014 against Hong Kong in Australia. He made his Twenty20 International debut for Papua New Guinea against Ireland in the 2015 ICC World Twenty20 Qualifier tournament on 15 July 2015.

In June 2015 on his first-class cricket debut, he scored a match-winning 124 not out for Papua New Guinea against the Netherlands in the 2015–17 ICC Intercontinental Cup. He scored three hundreds in his first four matches, also making centuries against Ireland (120) and Namibia (144 not out).

In February 2018, the International Cricket Council (ICC) named Vala as one of the ten players to watch ahead of the 2018 Cricket World Cup Qualifier tournament. In June 2018, at the Papua New Guinea Cricket Awards, he won the Tony Elly Medal for the best male player.

In August 2018, he was named as the captain of Papua New Guinea's squad for Group A of the 2018–19 ICC World Twenty20 East Asia-Pacific Qualifier tournament. He was the leading run-scorer in Group A of the tournament, with 294 runs in six matches. In March 2019, he was named as the captain of Papua New Guinea's squad for the Regional Finals of the 2018–19 ICC World Twenty20 East Asia-Pacific Qualifier tournament. The following month, he was named captain of Papua New Guinea's squad for the 2019 ICC World Cricket League Division Two tournament in Namibia.

In June 2019, he was selected to represent the Papua New Guinea cricket team in the men's tournament at the 2019 Pacific Games. In September 2019, Vala was named as the captain of Papua New Guinea's squad for the 2019 United States Tri-Nation Series. In the final match of the series, against Namibia, he scored his first century in ODI cricket, with 104 runs from 114 balls.

In September 2019, he was named as the captain of Papua New Guinea's squad for the 2019 ICC T20 World Cup Qualifier tournament in the United Arab Emirates. Ahead of the tournament, the International Cricket Council (ICC) named him as the key player in Papua New Guinea's squad. He was the leading run-scorer for Papua New Guinea in the tournament, with 197 runs in eight matches.

In November 2020, Vala was nominated for the ICC Men's Associate Cricketer of the Decade award. In August 2021, Vala was named as the captain of Papua New Guinea's squad for the 2021 ICC Men's T20 World Cup.

References

External links
 

1987 births
Living people
Papua New Guinean cricketers
Papua New Guinea One Day International cricketers
Papua New Guinea Twenty20 International cricketers
Place of birth missing (living people)